Nikolay Angelov Mitov (born 18 March 1972) is a Bulgarian former footballer and a former manager of Hebar Pazardzhik.

Club career
Mitov has played for Bulgarian teams - Hebar, Minyor and Levski, and German teams - Magdeburg and Holstein Kiel. With Levski he has played in 7 matches and has scored one goal.

Managerial career
From 12 April 2013 he is the coach of Levski Sofia after replacing Ilian Iliev. Before that he was assistant-manager in the team. Under his managerial tenure, "Levski" secured crucial victories against major rivals CSKA Sofia and Ludogorets Razgrad, but the team failed to win the A PFG title after being held to a 1:1 draw with Slavia Sofia in the last round of the league. Mitov parted ways with the "blues" on 12 July 2013, following the team's elimination by Kazakh club Irtysh Pavlodar in the UEFA Europa League.

In early December 2013, Mitov was announced as the new manager of PFC Montana in the B PFG on a contract until 30 June 2014. He was released from his duties in May 2014 after being unable to secure the team's promotion to the A PFG. Mitov was appointed as manager of Botev Plovdiv on 30 August 2016, but decided to resign a few hours later due to a hostile reception from the fans.

On 2 March 2017, he was appointed as manager of Levski Sofia, replacing Elin Topuzakov. After five months of stay, PFC Levski and Nikolay Mitov decided to split by mutual agreement due to poor results. The club thanked the coach for all his work as head of the team and for his responsibility to carry out his duties despite the poor performance of the team. Mr. Mitov received the possibility of one-month specialization in Spain.

Instead he returned in charge of Septemvri Sofia after the bad start of the team under Dimitar Vasev's tenure.

Honours

Club
Levski Sofia
 Bulgarian A Group (1): 1992–93

References

External links
 
 Profile at Levskisofia.info

1972 births
Living people
Bulgarian footballers
PFC Levski Sofia players
FC Hebar Pazardzhik players
1. FC Magdeburg players
PFC Minyor Pernik players
Bulgarian football managers
PFC Levski Sofia managers
FC Montana managers
First Professional Football League (Bulgaria) players
Botev Plovdiv managers
Association football forwards